The Australian National Broomball Championships is an annual broomball tournament, held in various cities across Australia, to determine Australia's national champions.  The tournament is organized by the national governing body for the sport, Broomball Australia.

The Championships have been held annually since 1990, and attracts representative teams from New South Wales, Queensland, Australian Capital Territory, South Australia, and Victoria.  Teams representing Gold Coast and Coffs Harbour have also participated in the past.   In 2003 an invitational team composed of American and Japanese players took part but were ineligible for finals.

The 2022 Broomball Championships was held from April 21 - April 24 at Penrith Ice Palace, including both Men's and Women's competitions.

Divisions
Five divisions are contested annually (starting year in brackets): Men's Elite (1990), Women's Elite (1999), Mixed Elite (1990), Men's Intermediate (2003), and Mixed Intermediate (2003).

Men's Elite division 
The Australian Capital Territory (ACT) has been by far the most successful team in the Men's Elite division.

Women's Elite division

Mixed Elite division 
In mixed play, each team has an equal number of male and female players on the ice.  The ACT have also had a successful history in this division.

Men's Intermediate division 
New South Wales have won two of the four Men's Intermediate titles since the division was introduced at the 2003 National Championships.

Mixed Intermediate division 
New South Wales have dominated the Mixed Intermediate division, winning three of the four titles up to 2006; the other one saw Coffs Harbour, a city in New South Wales, emerge victorious.

See also 
 Broomball Australia - organizing body
 Queensland Cyclones - representative team for Queensland

References

External links 
 National Championships Statistics from ACTBA (accessed 20 December 2006)
 2006 National Championships website (accessed 20 December 2006)

Broomball in Australia
Broomball